All for One is the third studio album by English heavy metal band Raven, released in August 1983. This would be their last album outside of a major label, also being said by fans to be their last "golden age" album, containing some of their finest work. It is also notable that Udo Dirkschneider, frontman of German band Accept would appear on a couple of the tracks recorded.

Tracks 11-13, which were added to the CD re-issue, were taken from "Break the Chain", Raven's single released around the same time. They feature Udo Dirkschneider performing vocal parts with John Gallagher.

Track listing

Personnel

Raven
 John Gallagher - basses, lead and backing vocals
 Mark Gallagher - guitar
 Rob Hunter - drums, backing vocals

Production
Michael Wagener - producer, engineer, backing vocals
Udo Dirkschneider - producer, backing vocals

References 

1983 albums
Raven (British band) albums
Albums produced by Michael Wagener
Megaforce Records albums